Odzi is a village in Manicaland Province, Zimbabwe located 32 km west of Mutare just off the main Harare-Mutare road. Odzi was established as a railway siding in 1899. It serves as a small trading centre in a tobacco and mix farming region. Petalite, Tantalite and tungsten ores are mined in the area.

Mutare District
Populated places in Manicaland Province